Innherred or Innherad is a traditional district in Trøndelag county in the central part of Norway. It consists of the areas around the inner part of the Trondheimsfjord in the central-east part of the county. The district includes the municipalities of Levanger, Frosta, Verdal, Inderøy, and Steinkjer. Sometimes, the municipalities of Snåsa and Namdalseid are also included in the Innherred district. There are several larger towns/cities in Innherred including Steinkjer, Levanger, and Verdalsøra.

The district is only a traditional geographical district, it has no administrative or governmental functions. Innherred is bordered by the district of Namdalen, to the east by Sweden, to the south by the district of Stjørdalen, and to the west by the district of Fosen.

References

External links
http://www.visitinnherred.com/

Districts of Trøndelag
Levanger
Frosta
Steinkjer
Verdal
Inderøy